Robert Leigh Turner   (born 13 March 1958) is a writer and British former diplomat. His final role was British Ambassador to Austria and UK Permanent Representative to the United Nations in Vienna from August 2016 to September 2021. As Ambassador and UK Permanent Representative he wrote a regular blog published in English and German.

From September 2012 to July 2016 Turner was British Consul-General in Istanbul, a post which included responsibility for UK Trade and Investment work in Turkey, South Caucasus, Central Asia and Ukraine.  From June 2008 to July 2012 he was British ambassador to Ukraine, resident in Kyiv.  From 2006 to 2008 he was Director, Overseas Territories in the Foreign and Commonwealth Office; Commissioner of the British Antarctic Territory; and Commissioner of the British Indian Ocean Territory.

Born in March 1958, he graduated from Downing College, Cambridge in 1979, joining the Civil Service as an administrative trainee the same year.  After working in the Departments of Transport and Environment, and the Treasury, he joined the Foreign and Commonwealth Office in 1983 and had postings in Austria, Russia, Germany, Ukraine and Turkey before returning to Vienna.

Whilst on unpaid leave, between 2002 and 2006, he wrote travel articles for the Financial Times, The Boston Globe and other newspapers.

Turner was appointed Companion of the Order of St Michael and St George (CMG) in the 2014 New Year Honours for services to British interests in Ukraine and Turkey.

Turner was succeeded as Ambassador to Austria and Permanent Representative to the United Nations in Vienna by Lindsay Skoll in September 2021. He then retired from the Diplomatic Service.

As Ambassador, Turner wrote and published novels and short stories under the name Robert Pimm. Since his retirement he continues to write a blog and has published several novels and a collection of short stories under his own name.

References

External links
Leigh Turner on Twitter
English blog 
Writing Blog

1958 births
Living people
Commissioners of the British Antarctic Territory
Commissioners of the British Indian Ocean Territory
Ambassadors of the United Kingdom to Ukraine
Companions of the Order of St Michael and St George
Members of HM Diplomatic Service
Civil servants in the Ministry of Transport (United Kingdom)
Civil servants in the Department of the Environment
Civil servants in HM Treasury
Ambassadors of the United Kingdom to Austria
20th-century British diplomats
21st-century British diplomats